Godwin Okpara (born 20 September 1972) is a Nigerian former professional footballer who played as a defender. He was part of the Nigeria national team squads that participated in the 1998 FIFA World Cup, 2000 Africa Cup of Nations and the 2000 Summer Olympics.

Career
Okpara was outstanding at the 1989 U-17 World Championship, and moved to Belgian club Beerschot. After some years of relative success playing for Eendracht Aalst, including winning the Belgian Ebony Shoe, he moved to play in France for RC Strasbourg and Paris Saint-Germain. While at Strasbourg he won the Coupe de la Ligue in 1997, playing in the final. His second season with PSG was miserable, making him return to Belgium and Standard Liège. Okpara retired after the 2003–04 season.

Prison 
In August 2005, Okpara was arrested by French police on charges of raping his 13-year-old adopted daughter. He was found guilty and imprisoned in June 2007 for thirteen years. His wife, Linda Okpara, was sentenced to 15 years in jail for torture of the same girl.

References

External links
 
 Nigerian Players

1972 births
Living people
Nigerian footballers
Association football defenders
Nigeria international footballers
Nigeria youth international footballers
Belgian Pro League players
Challenger Pro League players
Olympic footballers of Nigeria
Footballers at the 2000 Summer Olympics
1998 FIFA World Cup players
2000 African Cup of Nations players
K. Beerschot V.A.C. players
S.C. Eendracht Aalst players
Standard Liège players
RC Strasbourg Alsace players
Paris Saint-Germain F.C. players
Ligue 1 players
Nigerian expatriate footballers
Nigerian expatriate sportspeople in France
Expatriate footballers in France
Nigerian expatriate sportspeople in Belgium
Expatriate footballers in Belgium
Nigerian rapists
Nigerian people imprisoned abroad
Prisoners and detainees of France